Jim Matheos (born November 22, 1962) is an American guitarist and the primary songwriter for the progressive metal band Fates Warning, in which he has been the only consistent member since the group's beginning. Matheos also plays in OSI alongside Kevin Moore (Chroma Key, ex-Dream Theater), as well as making other appearances with many different bands and artists.

He has also released two solo instrumental albums on Metal Blade Records.

In 2003, Matheos collaborated with original Fates Warning vocalist John Arch on 2003's A Twist of Fate, Arch's first professional recording since leaving Fates Warning in 1987. The two later collaborated as Arch/Matheos, releasing full-length albums Sympathetic Resonance in 2011 and Winter Ethereal in 2019.

Fates Warning has released thirteen studio albums since their formation in 1982. Their latest studio album, Long Day Good Night, was released in 2020.

On February 17, 2014, Matheos released an experimental guitar album called Halo Effect. It was released by the independent record label Burning Shed.

Discography

With Fates Warning
 Night on Bröcken (1984)
 The Spectre Within (1985)
 Awaken the Guardian (1986)
 No Exit (1988) (Reissued 2007)
 Perfect Symmetry (1989)
 Parallels (1991)
 Inside Out (1994)
 Chasing Time (1995)
 A Pleasant Shade of Gray (1997)
 Still Life (1998)
 Disconnected (2000)
 FWX (2004)
 Darkness in a Different Light (2013)
 Theories of Flight (2016)
 Live Over Europe (2018)
 Long Day Good Night (2020)

With OSI
 Office of Strategic Influence (2003)
 Free (2006)
 Blood (2009)
 Fire Make Thunder (2012)

With Gordian Knot
 Emergent (2003)

With John Arch
 A Twist of Fate (2003)

With John Arch (Arch/Matheos)
 Sympathetic Resonance (2011)
 Winter Ethereal (2019)

With Memories of Machines
 Warm Winter (2011)

Solo
  First Impressions (1993)
  Away With Words (1999)
  Halo Effect (2014)

With Tuesday the Sky
 Drift (2017) 
 The Blurred Horizon (2021)

Kings of Mercia
 Kings of Mercia (2022)

Equipment

Guitar Rig & Signal Flow
A detailed gear diagram of Jim Matheos' 2012 Fates Warning guitar rig is well-documented.

References

External links
 The official Jim Matheos site.
 The official Fates Warning site.
 The official Arch/Matheos site.
 The official OSI site.
 The official online OSI shop.

American heavy metal guitarists
Progressive metal guitarists
Songwriters from Massachusetts
Living people
People from Westfield, Massachusetts
American people of Greek descent
Guitarists from Massachusetts
1962 births
American male guitarists
Fates Warning members
20th-century American guitarists
20th-century American male musicians
Gordian Knot (band) members
American male songwriters